Alpha Crateris (α Crateris, abbreviated Alpha Crt, α Crt), officially named Alkes , is a star in the constellation of Crater.

Nomenclature
α Crateris (Latinised to Alpha Crateris) is the star's Bayer designation.

It bore the traditional name Alkes, from the Arabic الكاس alkās or الكأس alka's "the cup". In the catalogue of stars in the Calendarium of Al Achsasi al Mouakket, this star was designated Aoul al Batjna (أول ألباطیة awwal al-bāṭiya), which was translated into Latin as Prima Crateris, meaning "first [star] of the Cup". In 2016, the International Astronomical Union organized a Working Group on Star Names (WGSN) to catalogue and standardize proper names for stars. The WGSN approved the name Alkes for this star on 12 September 2016 and it is now so included in the List of IAU-approved Star Names.

Namesake
 was a United States Navy  named after the star.

Properties
Alpha Crateris is an orange giant of spectral type K1III. It has an apparent magnitude of 4.07, and is 174 light-years from Earth. It is thought to be a horizontal branch star, meaning it is fusing helium in its core after a helium flash. Cool horizontal branch stars are often called red clump giants as they form a noticeable grouping near the hot edge of the red giant branch in the H–R diagrams of clusters with near-solar metallicity. Its surface temperature is 4691 K. Or it might be a red-giant branch star, still fusing hydrogen in a shell around an insert helium core, in which case it would be slightly less massive, older, cooler, larger, and more luminous.

References

Crater (constellation)
Crateris, Alpha
Crateris, 07
095272
053740
K-type giants
Alkes
4287
Durchmusterung objects
Horizontal-branch stars